Nelson Ramón Cruz Martínez Jr. (born July 1, 1980) is a Dominican-American professional baseball designated hitter and right fielder for the San Diego Padres of Major League Baseball (MLB). He has previously played in MLB for the Milwaukee Brewers, Texas Rangers, Baltimore Orioles, Seattle Mariners, Minnesota Twins, Tampa Bay Rays and Washington Nationals. Cruz is a seven-time MLB All-Star. Known for his power hitting, he has won four Silver Slugger Awards and two Edgar Martínez Awards.

After signing with the New York Mets organization in 1998, Cruz played his first major league game in 2005 with the Milwaukee Brewers. He had a breakthrough season in 2009, hitting 33 home runs for the Texas Rangers. Cruz played for the Rangers in the World Series in 2010 and 2011, and was named the Most Valuable Player of the 2011 American League Championship Series. On August 5, 2013, Cruz was suspended for 50 games by MLB for his involvement in the Biogenesis baseball scandal. In 2014, he led the major leagues with 40 home runs as a member of the Baltimore Orioles. He led the American League (AL) with 119 RBI in 2017 while playing for the Seattle Mariners. Cruz hit 346 home runs during the 2010s, which was the highest number of home runs hit by any player in that decade. In 2020, based on his work in the community, Cruz was selected as the Marvin Miller Man of the Year and the ESPYs Muhammad Ali Sports Humanitarian Award winner, and in 2021, he received the Roberto Clemente Award.

He is also infamous for missing a fly ball in Game 6 of the 2011 World Series that would have clinched the Rangers first championship; instead, their opponents, the St. Louis Cardinals, came back to win that game and Game 7 to win the World Series.

Early life
Cruz was born on July 1, 1980, in Las Matas de Santa Cruz, Dominican Republic.  His father, Nelson Cruz Sr., also played professional baseball in the Dominican Republic. Both his parents are successful professors and they raised Cruz and his two sisters, Nelsy and Olga, in a well-to-do Dominican neighborhood.  Growing up, Cruz's passion was for basketball, not baseball.  His idol was Michael Jordan and as a teenager Cruz played for the Dominican Republic Junior National Basketball Team. He attended the high school where his father taught history. In addition to playing sports, Cruz worked as a mechanic's helper with his uncle at a tractor factory. He also shined shoes and learned how to repair them.  In September 2012, he donated $20,000 to help buy a firetruck for Las Matas de Santa Cruz, enlisting AMR's help in also donating two ambulances.

Professional career

Minor leagues
On February 17, 1998, Cruz signed with the New York Mets organization as a non-drafted free agent. Cruz played for three years in the Dominican Summer League.

On August 30, 2000, the Mets traded Cruz to the Oakland Athletics in exchange for shortstop Jorge Velandia, as starting shortstop Rey Ordóñez was out with a broken arm, and Melvin Mora, Mike Bordick, and Kurt Abbott proved unable to fill in. Cruz spent the 2001 season with the AZL Athletics, slashing .250/.283/.409 with 3 home runs and 16 RBI in 23 games. The following season, he played for the Low-A Vancouver Canadians, batting .276/.316/.397 with 4 home runs and 25 RBI. In 2003, Cruz spent the year in Single-A with the Kane County Cougars and hit .238/.292/.430 career-highs in home runs (20) and RBI (85). Cruz split the 2004 season between the High-A Modesto A's, Double-A Midland RockHounds, and Triple-A Sacramento River Cats, and set new career-highs in home runs (26) and RBI (100) while batting .326/.390/.562 in 137 games between the three teams.

Milwaukee Brewers (2005)
On December 16, 2004, Cruz was traded to the Milwaukee Brewers in exchange for infielder Keith Ginter. Cruz was assigned to the Double-A Huntsville Stars to begin the 2005 season before receiving a promotion to the Triple-A Nashville Sounds.

Cruz made his major league debut with the Brewers on September 17, 2005, as a late inning defensive replacement at right field wearing #8 against the Houston Astros. He had one hit in five at-bats for the Brewers in limited action. His only hit was a double off Aaron Harang of the Cincinnati Reds on September 28. Cruz was assigned to Nashville to begin the 2006 season and hit .302/.378/.528 in 102 games with the team.

Texas Rangers (2006–2013)
On July 28, 2006, the Brewers sent Cruz and outfielder Carlos Lee to the Texas Rangers in exchange for Laynce Nix, Kevin Mench, Francisco Cordero and minor league pitcher Julian Cordero. Cruz would wear #17 during his time with Texas. He hit his first career home run on July 31 against Willie Eyre of the Twins. On August 16, Cruz hit the first grand slam of his career off of Kevin Gregg of the Angels. On September 4, 2006, against the Athletics, he hit an inside-the-park home run in which his bat broke on impact. In spring training for the 2007 season, Cruz got off to a rough start, but finished strong by hitting three home runs in the final week, including a walk-off home run in the final game of spring training.

Cruz failed to make the major league roster prior to the 2008 season and cleared waivers after being designated for assignment because he had exhausted his minor league options. With the Triple-A Oklahoma RedHawks, Cruz had a .341 batting average and had 37 home runs and 100 runs batted in (RBI); for his efforts, Cruz won the 2008 Pacific Coast League MVP Award. During his time with the Redhawks, Cruz began using an open batting stance, which helped him see the ball better and become a more productive hitter.  On August 25, 2008, the Rangers purchased Cruz's contract from the RedHawks.

Cruz had a breakthrough season in 2009. In July, he was selected as an All-Star as a replacement for injured Torii Hunter.  He also participated in the 2009 Home Run Derby, finishing second to Brewers first baseman Prince Fielder. Cruz finished the season with 33 home runs.

Cruz and teammate Ian Kinsler each hit three home runs in the 2010 AL Division Series against the Tampa Bay Rays, marking only the second time in Major League history that two teammates each hit three homers in a postseason series of five games or fewer (joining Babe Ruth and Lou Gehrig, who did it in the 1928 World Series). In Game 5 of the 2010 World Series vs. the San Francisco Giants, Cruz hit a home run off of Tim Lincecum in the 7th inning. It was around this time that Cruz began to refer to his baseball bat as a "boomstick."

In 2011, Cruz and Ian Kinsler became the first two teammates in major league history to homer in each of the first three games in a season, joining Dean Palmer (1992) as the only Texas ballplayers to ever homer in the first three games of the season.  Also, in his very next game, Cruz became the third player ever to homer in each of the first four games of the season, joining Willie Mays and Mark McGwire.

Nelson Cruz became the second hitter to hit a home run into the upper deck in right field as a right-handed batter in the history of Rangers Ballpark in Arlington. The other was hit by former Ranger Chad Curtis, during the 2000 season. On July 22, he had 8 RBIs in a game against the Toronto Blue Jays; it was Cruz's career high in RBIs.

In 2011, Cruz batted .263 with 29 home runs.  He led AL right fielders in range factor for the third straight year (2.29). On October 10, 2011, Cruz hit a walk-off grand slam in Game 2 of the ALCS versus the Detroit Tigers. He became the first player in baseball history to hit a walk-off grand slam in a postseason game.

Cruz hit a 3-run home run to seal Game 4 of the ALCS for the Rangers against the Tigers. He became the first player to hit multiple extra-inning home runs in the same postseason series. During the 2011 ALCS, Cruz hit six home runs and had 13 RBIs, both postseason series records.  His efforts earned him the 2011 ALCS MVP award. Cruz hit a solo home run to put the Texas Rangers up 6 to 4 against the St. Louis Cardinals in Game 6 of the 2011 World Series. The home run allowed Cruz to tie the record for most postseason home runs in a season at 8; he shares the achievement with Carlos Beltrán and Barry Bonds.

Biogenesis Scandal
In January 2013, Cruz was linked to buying performance-enhancing drugs from a clinic based in Miami.   On August 5, 2013, Cruz was suspended 50 games by Major League Baseball for his involvement in the Biogenesis scandal. Cruz in a statement said that that in November of 2011 to January, 2012 had an undiagnosed "serious gastrointestinal infection, helicobacter pylori," which went undiagnosed for over a month. According to Bosch the head of Biogenesis Lab, he sold $4,000 of product to Nelson Cruz, whom he nicknames "Mohamad." Cruz is one of 13 players who have been banned for their connection to the anti-aging clinic.

Cruz became a free agent following the 2013 season, turning down a $14 million qualifying offer from the Rangers. The fact that he had draft pick compensation attached to him and lingering concerns over his recent PED suspension made it difficult for him to find a new deal during the offseason.

Baltimore Orioles (2014)

On February 24, 2014, Cruz signed a one-year, $8 million, contract with the Baltimore Orioles. Cruz wore #23 with the Orioles and continued wearing 23 in his stops with the Seattle Mariners, Minnesota Twins, and Tampa Bay Rays.

On July 5, Cruz had his first career 5-hit game, with two singles, two doubles, and a home run, falling a triple shy of the cycle (he was tagged out just short of third base), against the Red Sox. He was elected into his third MLB All-Star Game, as a designated hitter, for the American League. On September 7, 2014, in a game against the Tampa Bay Rays, Cruz went 4-for-5 with two home runs and 7 RBIs, including his 100th RBI of the season. His previous season high in RBIs had been 90, set in 2012. Cruz drove in all 7 runs the Orioles scored. In 159 games played in 2014, Cruz had an MLB-leading 40 home runs along with a .271 batting average, 32 doubles, and 108 RBI.

In the first game of the 2014 ALDS, Cruz homered against the Detroit Tigers' Max Scherzer. It was his 15th home run in 35 career postseason games, tying Cruz for 10th place on the all-time postseason home run list with Babe Ruth. In the third game of the 2014 ALDS, Cruz hit his 16th postseason home run against the Tigers' David Price, tying him for 9th place on the all-time postseason home run list with Carlos Beltrán. Cruz declared free agency after rejecting the Orioles' qualifying offer of $15.3 million.

Seattle Mariners (2015–2018)
On December 4, 2014, Cruz signed a four-year contract with the Seattle Mariners worth $57 million.

Cruz was named the starting DH for the 2015 American League All-Star team, marking the 4th time (3rd consecutive) that he was named an All-Star. He went on to have arguably the best season of his career in 2015, hitting .302 with a career-high 44 home runs and 93 RBIs. He hit the third-longest home run in MLB in 2015, at 483 feet. He also won his first career Silver Slugger Award, and finished 6th in the American League MVP voting.

In 2016, Cruz batted .287 with 43 home runs and 104 RBIs. He was not selected as an All-Star, but did finish 15th in the American League MVP voting. His batted balls had the highest average exit velocity of the season in the major leagues, at 94.4 miles per hour. He also hit the second-longest home run in MLB in 2016, at 493 feet.

Cruz was selected as an All-Star in 2017 for the fifth time in his career. On July 7, he hit his 300th career home run in a Mariners win over the Oakland Athletics.  Cruz led the AL in RBIs with 119, and led the Mariners in home runs (39), runs scored (91), extra base hits (67), walks (70), OPS (.924), on-base percentage (.375), and slugging percentage (.549). He won the Edgar Martínez Award, also known as the Outstanding Designated Hitter Award.

Cruz was named to the 2018 Major League Baseball All-Star Game. He batted .256 for the season, along with 37 home runs and 97 RBIs. He was the 8th-oldest player in the American League. He became a free agent after the 2018 season.

Minnesota Twins (2019–2021)
On January 2, 2019, Cruz signed a one-year contract with the Minnesota Twins worth $14.3 million. The contract also included a $12 million team option for the 2020 season.

On September 22, 2019, Cruz hit his 400th career home run and 40th home run of the season versus the Kansas City Royals.  He batted .311/.392/.639 with 41 home runs and 108 RBI in 120 games on the season.  He produced the highest hard-contact percentage of all major league batters, at 52.5%. He was the fifth-oldest player in the American League.  For first time in his MLB career, he did not play in the field; he played in 114 games as a DH and another six as a pinch hitter.  His 1.031 OPS matched the club record, and his home run and RBI totals set club records at DH.  He ranked second in the AL in OPS and SLG, tied for third in home runs, placed sixth in batting, and seventh in RBI.  He followed Hank Aaron and Barry Bonds as the only players to hit 40 home runs in their age-39 season or after.  These accomplishments helped net Cruz his third career Silver Slugger Award.  Cruz would also win the Edgar Martinez Award for the second time.

Cruz hit 346 home runs during the 2010s, which was the highest number of home runs hit by any player in that decade.

The Twins picked up Cruz' option for 2020, in which he batted .303 with a .992 OPS, 16 home runs and 33 RBI.  Although slowed by a sore knee later in the season, Cruz appeared in 53 of 60 games.  He doubled twice in a span of six at bats in a season-ending AL Wild Card Series loss to the Houston Astros.  He ranked third in the AL in OBP (.397), fourth in OPS, fifth in SLG (.595), tied for fifth in home runs and seventh in batting average, leading to winning the Silver Slugger Award at DH, his fourth overall Silver Slugger.  He finished sixth in the AL MVP voting.

For his efforts assisting the community, Cruz was selected as the 2020 Marvin Miller Man of the Year by the MLB Players Association, as that player whom his peers deem earned "most respect based on his leadership on the field and in the community," notably in his hometown of Las Matas de Santa Cruz.  He also was the ESPYs Muhammed Ali Sports Humanitarian Award winner in 2020.  Cruz donated a police station, a fire station, replaced an aging ambulance and spearheaded a $400,000 donation drive to help alleviate food shortages induced by the COVID-19 pandemic.  His leadership inspired his teammates to assist in their own communities.

Cruz became a free agent following the 2020 World Series. On February 10, 2021, Cruz signed a one-year, $13 million contract to stay with Minnesota for the 2021 season. Cruz was named an All-Star for the team in 2021, and hit .294/.370/.537 with 19 home runs and 50 RBI in 85 games.

In 2021, TheAthletic.com called Cruz "one of the game’s elite power hitters", while CBS Sports described him as "a steady purveyor of elite power production".

Tampa Bay Rays (2021)
On July 22, 2021, Cruz was traded to the Tampa Bay Rays alongside Calvin Faucher in exchange for Joe Ryan and Drew Strotman.

Washington Nationals (2022)
On March 13, 2022, Cruz signed a one-year, $12 million contract with a mutual option for 2023 with the Washington Nationals.  On August 15, Cruz went 2 for 4 against the San Diego Padres and recorded 2,000 career hits in his MLB career.  

Cruz ended the season batting .234/.313/.337 in 448 at bats with 10 home runs and 64 RBIs in 124 games at DH, grounding into 16 double plays (9th in the NL). He was the oldest qualified batter in major league baseball.

San Diego Padres (2023)
On January 23, 2023 the San Diego Padres signed Cruz to a one year, $1 million contract.

International career

Cruz was selected for the Dominican Republic national baseball team at the 2009 World Baseball Classic, 2013 World Baseball Classic, 2017 World Baseball Classic, and 2023 World Baseball Classic. 
In addition to playing in the 2023 World Baseball Classic, he also served as the team’s general manager. Cruz and the Dominican Republic won the 2013 World Baseball Classic and Cruz was named to the 2013 All-World Baseball Classic team.

Personal life
Cruz has one daughter and three sons. He resides in Las Matas De Santa Cruz, Dominican Republic in the offseason.

After the 2018 season, Cruz became an American citizen.

See also

 List of Baltimore Orioles awards
 List of Major League Baseball annual home run leaders
 List of Major League Baseball annual runs batted in leaders
 List of Major League Baseball career hits leaders
 List of Major League Baseball career home run leaders
 List of Major League Baseball career putouts as a right fielder leaders
 List of Major League Baseball career runs batted in leaders
 List of Major League Baseball career slugging percentage leaders
 List of Major League Baseball career strikeouts by batters leaders
 List of Major League Baseball career extra base hits leaders
 List of Major League Baseball players from the Dominican Republic
 Minnesota Twins award winners and league leaders
 Seattle Mariners award winners and league leaders
 Texas Rangers award winners and league leaders

References

External links

 
 

1980 births
2009 World Baseball Classic players
2013 World Baseball Classic players
2017 World Baseball Classic players
American League All-Stars
American League Championship Series MVPs
American League home run champions
American League RBI champions
American sportspeople of Dominican Republic descent
Arizona League Athletics players
Arizona League Rangers players
Baltimore Orioles players
Dominican Republic emigrants to the United States
Dominican Republic expatriate baseball players in Canada
Dominican Republic sportspeople in doping cases
Frisco RoughRiders players
Gigantes del Cibao players
Huntsville Stars players
Kane County Cougars players
Living people
Major League Baseball designated hitters
Major League Baseball players from the Dominican Republic
Major League Baseball players suspended for drug offenses
Major League Baseball right fielders
Midland RockHounds players
Milwaukee Brewers players
Minnesota Twins players
Modesto A's players
Nashville Sounds players
Oklahoma City RedHawks players
Oklahoma RedHawks players
Pacific Coast League MVP award winners
People from Monte Cristi Province
Round Rock Express players
Sacramento River Cats players
Seattle Mariners players
Silver Slugger Award winners
Tampa Bay Rays players
Texas Rangers players
Vancouver Canadians players
Washington Nationals players
World Baseball Classic players of the Dominican Republic